is a former Nippon Professional Baseball infielder and the current coach of the Hokkaido Nippon-Ham Fighters.

External links

1979 births
Living people
Baseball people from Shizuoka Prefecture
Japanese baseball players
Nippon Professional Baseball infielders
Nippon Ham Fighters players
Hokkaido Nippon-Ham Fighters players
Japanese baseball coaches
Nippon Professional Baseball coaches